Basie Big Band is a 1975 studio album by Count Basie and his orchestra.

Track listing 
 "Front Burner" – 5:54
 "Freckle Face" – 6:26
 "Orange Sherbet" – 3:42
 "Soft as Velvet" – 3:51
 "The Heat's On" – 2:47
 "Midnight Freight" – 6:08
 "Give 'M Time" – 6:07
 "The Wind Machine" – 3:08
 "Tall Cotton" – 5:50

All music by Sammy Nestico.

Personnel 
 Count Basie – piano
 Pete Minger – trumpet
 Frank Szabo
 Dave Stahl
 Bobby Mitchell
 Sonny Cohn
 Al Grey – trombone
 Curtis Fuller
 Bill Hughes
 Mel Wanzo - trombone
 Bobby Plater – alto saxophone
 Danny Turner
 Jimmy Forrest – tenor saxophone
 Eric Dixon
 Charlie Fowlkes – baritone saxophone
 John Duke – double bass
 Freddie Green – guitar
 Butch Miles – drums

References 

1975 albums
Count Basie Orchestra albums
Pablo Records albums
Albums produced by Norman Granz